The Romance of Transportation in Canada is a 1952 animated short film made by the National Film Board of Canada. Part of the postwar Canada Carries On series, it offers a humorous account of the history of transportation in Canada. The film was directed by Colin Low and produced by Tom Daly. 

The Romance of Transportation in Canada featured animation by Wolf Koenig and Robert Verrall and was narrated by Guy Glover. Eldon Rathburn composed the film score. It was the first NFB animated film to be nominated abroad, and the first to be nominated for an Academy Award in animation.

Synopsis 
Throughout its history, transportation in Canada was fraught with difficulty especially looking at Canada's vast distances and natural obstacles such as forest, mountains and rivers. Eventually these obstacles were met with unique solutions, beginning with Canada's First Nations whose canoes allowed for transport over inland waterways. Early pioneers faced the same problems but with larger bateau, cargo could be hauled over longer distances on water.  On land, the use of ox-drawn carts became the means to cross rough terrain until stagecoaches were introduced.

With the advent of steam power, and the construction of the Trans-Canada Railway finally the great distances of Canada were overcome. In the early 20th Century, the internal combustion engine then made the next step forward for modern travel with the proliferation of automobiles, aircraft, and even "flying saucers" to come.

Production
The Romance of Transportation in Canada was an animated short in the NFB's films Canada Carries On series (first created as a wartime series). The film was a product of the NFB's Unit B production team. The Romance of Transportation in Canada marked the NFB’s first major foray into industrial animation, influenced not by the auteur style of NFB animation studio founder Norman McLaren, but by the United Productions of America (UPA) style.

Reception
The Romance of Transportation in Canada was produced for television broadcast on CBC Television. Individual films were distributed worldwide by the NFB and were also made available to film libraries operated by university and provincial authorities. A total of 199 films in the Canada Carries On series were produced before the series was canceled in 1959.

Canadian film critic Dean Duncan reviewed The Romance of Transportation in Canada and considered it one of Colin Low's finest works. "Here, the title lettering is really cool, the ox is a great character, the snow sections are beautiful, you might even say authoritative. That overhead prairie shot looks real."

Canadian film critic Tom Waugh has also noted that the film's commentary; written and narrated by Norman McLaren's lover, Guy Glover, features "a high camp commentary" with "very queer inflections."

Awards
7th British Academy Film Awards, London: BAFTA Special Award, 1954
1953 Cannes Film Festival, Cannes: Award for Best Animation, 1953
5th Canadian Film Awards, Montreal: Honourable Mention, 1953
25th Academy Awards, Los Angeles: Nominee, Best Short Subject, Cartoons, 1953

See also
Transitions, a 1986 NFB IMAX film in 3D about transportation in Canada, also directed by Colin Low

References

Notes

Citations

Bibliography

 Ellis, Jack C. and Betsy A. McLane. New History of Documentary Film. London: Continuum International Publishing Group, 2005. .
 Evsns, Gary. In the National Interest: A Chronicle of the National Film Board of Canada from 1949 to 1989. Toronto: University of Toronto Press, 2001. . 
 Lenburg, Jeff. Who's Who in Animated Cartoons: An International Guide to Film and Television's Award-Winning and Legendary Animators. New York: Applause Books, 2006. .

External links
 
 

Canadian animated short films
Films directed by Colin Low (filmmaker)
Short Film Palme d'Or winners
BAFTA winners (films)
National Film Board of Canada animated short films
Transport in Canada
Transport films
1952 short films
1950s animated short films
Canadian comedy short films
1952 animated films
Films scored by Eldon Rathburn
Films produced by Tom Daly
Canada Carries On
1950s English-language films
1950s Canadian films